Sibbaldianthe bifurca is a species of flowering plant in the family Rosaceae which can be found in Russian, Korean, and Mongolian steppes, grasslands and various slopes on an elevation of . It is also found on sandy coasts of North and Northeast China. It was described by Carl Linnaeus in 1753 in his book Species Plantarum as Potentilla bifurca.

Description
Flowers are as tall as  while the sepals are ovate and the apex is acute. It petals are yellow in colour and are obovate with rounded apex. the ovary is pilose white the achenes are smooth. Both flowers and fruits bloom from May to October.

References

Further reading

Potentilleae
Plants described in 1753
Taxa named by Carl Linnaeus